Houston Branch (March 5, 1899 – January 1968) was an American screenwriter. He wrote for 50 films between 1927 and 1958. He was born in St. Paul, Minnesota.

Selected filmography
 Once and Forever (1927)
 Ladies of the Night Club (1928)
 Sioux Blood (1929)
 Shanghai Lady (1929)
 Square Shoulders (1929)
 Captain of the Guard (1930)
 I Like Your Nerve (1931)
 Manhattan Parade (1931)
 Tiger Shark (1932)
 The Match King (1932)
 Mr. Wong, Detective (1938)
 The Blonde from Singapore (1941)
 Girls of the Big House (1945)
 Sweethearts on Parade (1953)
 Congo Crossing (1956)

References

External links

1899 births
1968 deaths
American male screenwriters
20th-century American male writers
20th-century American screenwriters